Sevenia howensis is a butterfly in the family Nymphalidae. It is found on Madagascar. The habitat consists of forests.

References

Butterflies described in 1886
howensis
Butterflies of Africa
Taxa named by Otto Staudinger